You're Gettin' Even While I'm Gettin' Odd is the eleventh and final studio album by American rock band the J. Geils Band and the only one recorded without singer Peter Wolf. The band's keyboardist Seth Justman produced the album, performed all the song and horn arrangements, wrote all the songs with lyrical help from Paul Justman, and provided the majority of the album's lead vocals, with drummer Stephen Jo Bladd singing lead on three tracks. Compared to the band's earlier works, which leaned towards a more live rock band sound, You're Gettin' Even While I'm Gettin' Odd emphasizes dubbing and production. The album was released on October 5, 1984, by EMI Records.

The album contained one single, "Concealed Weapons", which peaked at No. 63 on the Billboard Hot 100 chart.  Cash Box said of "Concealed Weapons" that "J. Geils here rocks hard and with a contemporary feeling on a track that makes a statement of sorts against its title."  Billboard called it a "playful rock 'n' roll stomper."

Track listing
All music written by Seth Justman, lyrics written by Seth and Paul Justman.

Personnel
The J. Geils Band
Seth Justman – keyboards, lead (1, 3–8) and backing vocals, spoken word (5)
J. Geils – guitars
Danny Klein – bass guitar, "flex bass"
Magic Dick – harmonicas (7, 8), soprano saxophone, backing vocals
Stephen Jo Bladd – drums, lead (2, 4, 9) and backing vocals

The Uptown Horns
Crispin Cioe – alto and baritone saxophones
Arno Hecht - tenor saxophone
Paul Litteral – trumpet

Additional personnel
Phoebe Snow – backing vocal (4)
Cookie Watkins, Fonda Rae, and Judith Spears - backing vocals (2, 4, 6, 9)
The Institutional Radio Choir (directed by Carl Williams, Jr.) – backing vocals (9)
Jim Donnelly - backing vocals

Charts
Album

Singles

References

1984 albums
The J. Geils Band albums
EMI Records albums
Albums produced by Seth Justman